Thomas Scott "Flip" Phillips (born February 22, 1973) is an American musician, songwriter and record producer. He is the drummer, percussionist, keyboardist and co-founder of the bands Creed, Alter Bridge, and Projected.

Life and career

Phillips grew up in Madison, Florida. He started out playing in a band called Crosscut at 18. He was a founding member of the band Creed. After Creed dissolved, he joined Alter Bridge in 2004 with fellow then-former Creed members bassist Brian Marshall and lead guitarist Mark Tremonti. He is a self-taught drummer, starting at age 18, and has also played piano and saxophone. Phillips is credited with playing drums and keyboards on Creed's 2001 album Weathered, along with 1997's My Own Prison and 1999's Human Clay. In early 2012, Phillips joined the supergroup Projected with musicians from Sevendust and Submersed.

He now lives in Central Florida with his wife and their daughter.

Influences
Phillips cites the following drummers as his influences: Will Calhoun (Living Colour), Matt Cameron (Soundgarden/Pearl Jam), Lars Ulrich (Metallica), John Bonham (Led Zeppelin), Mike Portnoy (Dream Theater), Morgan Rose (Sevendust), and Neil Peart (Rush). His favorite bands are Living Colour, Tool, Pink Floyd, Led Zeppelin and Rush. His favorite albums are Time's Up (Living Colour), The Dark Side of the Moon and The Wall (Pink Floyd), Led Zeppelin IV (Led Zeppelin), Master of Puppets (Metallica) and Superunknown (Soundgarden).

Equipment

Scott has, in the past, used Premier Drums, but has recently been seen with DW Drums.  Scott also uses Evans Drumheads, Zildjian cymbals, and Vic Firth drumsticks.

Drums: DW Drums Jazz Series
 22x18" Bass Drum
 10x8" Rack Tom
 12x9" Rack Tom
 16x16" Floor Tom
 18x16" Floor Tom
 14x6.5" Ludwig Black Beauty Snare Drum

Cymbals: Zildjian
 14" A custom top w/ 14" A Quick beat bottom
 18" Z Custom Medium Crash (x2)
 19" Z Custom Medium Crash (x2)
 10" A Splash
 22" A Custom Ping Ride
 9.5" Zil-Bel
 20" Oriental China Trash

Drumheads: Evans
 Snare: Power Center over Hazy 300
 Toms: G2 Clear over G1 Clear
 Bass Drum: EQ3 Clear over EQ3 Black Resonant

Drumsticks:
 Vic Firth 5B - More substantial than a 5A, but not overpowering. Medium taper for a great balance. Diameter: .595" [1.51 cm], Length 16" [40.64 cm], Taper: Medium

Discography

With Creed
 (1997) My Own Prison (Wind-Up Records)
 (1999) Human Clay (Wind-Up Records)
 (2001) Weathered (Wind-Up Records)
 (2009) Full Circle (Wind-Up Records)
 (2009) Creed Live (Wind-Up Records)

With Alter Bridge
 (2004) One Day Remains (Wind-Up Records)
 (2007) Blackbird (Universal Republic Records)
 (2009) Live from Amsterdam (Universal Republic Records)
 (2010) AB III (Alter Bridge Recordings/Roadrunner Records)
 (2012) Live at Wembley (Roadrunner Records)
 (2013) Fortress (Roadrunner Records)
 (2016) The Last Hero (Napalm Records)
 (2017) Live at the O2 Arena + Rarities (Napalm Records)
 (2018) Live at the Royal Albert Hall (Napalm Records)
 (2019) Walk the Sky (Napalm Records)
 (2022) Pawns & Kings (Napalm Records)

With Submersed 

 (2004) In Due Time (Wind-up Records)

With Projected
 (2012) Human (Yaya Papu)
 (2017) Ignite My Insanity (Rat Pak Records)
 (2022) Hypoxia (Rat Pak Records)

References

External links
 Scott Phillips fansite "FlipOnline" with biographical information, also pictures, and equipment information and bulletin board
Hootiegolf.com

1973 births
Alter Bridge members
American heavy metal drummers
Creed (band) members
Living people
People from Valdosta, Georgia
20th-century American drummers
American male drummers
Projected members
21st-century American drummers